Revolution is a 2019 studio album by American pop and rock singer Paula Cole.

Recording and release

Revolution explores political themes that connected to Cole's 1999 album Amen and the singer promoted this album by debuting her cover of the Marvin Gaye ecological anthem "Mercy Mercy Me (The Ecology)". After releasing a collection of jazz ballads in 2017, she considered a second album of musical standards, but felt that the political climate in the United States warranted new material that reflected the necessity of "finding empathy" during political turmoil.

Reception
Writing for PopMatters, Charles Donovan scored Revolution an eight out of 10, writing that her Cole's political emphasis works with her music and considers the album "an exceptional piece of work, a timely reminder of how soulful, perceptive and harrowing a writer and singer Cole is and has always been".

Track listing
All songs written by Paula Cole, except as noted
"Intro: Revolution (Is a State of Mind)" (includes an excerpt from a speech by Martin Luther King, Jr.) – 4:17
"Shake the Sky" – 3:59
"Blues in Gray" – 3:50
"Silent" – 8:25
"Go On" – 5:58
"All or Nothing" – 4:29
"7 Deadly Sins" – 5:08
"The Ecology (Mercy Mercy Me)" (Marvin Gaye) – 5:15
"Undertow (One Life Lost)" – 5:01
"Universal Empathy" – 6:58
"Dhammapada" – 2:22

Personnel
"Intro: Revolution (Is A State Of Mind)"
Paula Cole – piano, vocals
Jay Bellerose – drums
Chris Bruce – guitar
Ross Gallagher – electric upright bass
Nona Hendryx – vocals
Bob Thompson – speech
"Shake the Sky"
Paula Cole – piano, handclaps, vocals
Jay Bellerose – drums, percussion, handclaps
Chris Bruce – guitar
Ross Gallagher – electric upright bass, handclaps
Darcel Wilson – vocals
"Blues in Gray"
Paula Cole – piano, vocals
Chris Bruce – guitar
Ross Gallagher – electric upright bass
Max Weinstein – drums
"Silent"
Paula Cole – piano, clarinet, vocals
Ross Gallagher – electric upright bass
"Go On"
Paula Cole – piano, vocals
Jay Bellerose – drums
Chris Bruce – guitar, electric bass
Ross Gallagher – backing vocals
"All or Nothing"
Paula Cole – piano, vocals
Jay Bellerose – drums
Chris Bruce – guitar
Ross Gallagher – electric upright bass, backing vocals
"7 Deadly Sins"
Paula Cole – piano, vocals
Jay Bellerose – drums
Chris Bruce – guitar
Dennis Crouch – electric upright bass
Me'Shell NdegéOcello – speech
"The Ecology (Mercy Mercy Me)"
Paula Cole – vocals
Jay Bellerose – drums
Chris Bruce – guitar
Ross Gallagher – Arco bass
"Undertow (One Life Lost)"
Paula Cole – piano, handclaps, vocals
Chris Bruce – guitar, handclaps
Ross Gallagher – electric upright bass, handclaps
Max Weinstein – drums, handclaps
Darcel Wilson – vocals, handclaps
"Universal Empathy"
Paula Cole – piano, harmonium, vocals
Jay Bellerose – drums, percussion
Chris Bruce – guitar, bass guitar
Jebin Bruni – keyboards
"Dhammapada"
Paula Cole – piano, vocals
Chris Bruce – guitar
Jebin Bruni – keyboards
Ross Gallagher – electric upright bass
Max Weinstein – drums
"Hope Is Everywhere"
Paula Cole – piano, electric piano, drums, handclaps, vocals
Jay Bellerose – drums
Chris Bruce – guitar, electric bass
Ross Gallagher – electric upright bass, drum programming, handclaps, backing vocals
"St. Cecilia"
Paula Cole – piano, vocals
Jay Bellerose – drums
Chris Bruce – guitar
Ross Gallagher – electric upright bass

Revolution was produced by Paula Cole with co-production by Chris Bruce.

See also
List of 2019 albums

References

External links

2019 albums
Paula Cole albums
Political music albums by American artists